This is a list of town tramway systems in Brazil by Estado. It includes all tram systems, past and present.

Alagoas

Amazonas

Bahia

Ceará

Aracati - Horse traction (?). Morrison (1989, page 43)  states that an 1873 brochure issued by the Brazilian government mentions a tramway project in this town; it is not known whether the tramway was built.

Espírito Santo

Goiás

Maranhão

Mato Grosso

Minas Gerais

Note for Campanha: Morrison (1989, page 87)  describes conflicting information on whether the tramway was electrified, and when it closed.
Note for Mar de Espanha: Morrison (1989, page 79)  states that one source (dated 1889) mentions a tramway in this town, but no other information could be located.

Pará

Paraíba

Paraná

Pernambuco

Garanhuns - Diesel traction . Test operations conducted with a former Recife tramcar, equipped with a diesel engine, in 1968 over a (then recently closed) railway branch. The engine, overloaded by large numbers of passengers seeking to ride on opening day, failed. Public service was not attempted thereafter.
Goiana - Horse traction (?). Morrison (1989, page 55)  states that an 1873 brochure issued by the Brazilian government mentions a tramway project in this town; it is not known whether the tramway was built.

Piauí

Rio de Janeiro

Barra do Piraí - Peschkes (Part 1, 1980, page 45) lists a tramway (using animal traction) in this town. Morrison (1989, page 120) states that an 1888 government report describes three concessions for tramway construction, and a 1922 publication includes two photographs showing track and overhead wire in streets. However, he adds that a visit to the city "failed to produce any information about the existence of a passenger tramway."
Note for Mendes: Tramway extended from Humberto Antunes railway station. Electric traction (for goods) and petrol traction (for passengers), ca. 1912 - 1952. Unconnected line extended from Mendes railway station, horse traction, 1900 - 1932.
Note for Niterói: Niterói tramway undertaking extended to São Gonçalo from 25 August 1910 (electric traction). São Gonçalo tramway absorbed by Niterói undertaking from 1921.
Notes for Rio de Janeiro: Period of no tramway operation following closure of first line (to Tijuca, in 1866) and opening of the second line (to Largo do Machado) on 9 October 1868 (later extended to Jardim Botânico). Tijuca line reopened (by a new undertaking) on 19 January 1870. First tramway line in Zona Norte opened 29 November 1873.
Experiments with accumulator (storage battery) traction on 2 July 1887 and 16 July 1887.
Electric traction inaugurated in Zona Sul on 8 October 1892, and in Zona Norte on 1 July 1905. Last line in Zona Norte closed 21 May 1963. Only one line (in Zona Sul) remained in operation after 17 May 1965.
Alto da Boa Vista line  retained as tourist line, but operation suspended because of storm damage 10 January 1966 – May 1966. Operation again suspended because of storm damage, 22 January 1967 – Mar 1967. Following a period of intermittent operation, the line was declared closed on 21 December 1967.
Note for Santa Cruz: Connected Santa Cruz and Itaguaí (1880 - 1907, replaced by railway branch), and Santa Cruz and Sepetiba (27 June 1884 - 1911).

Rio Grande do Norte

Rio Grande do Sul

Santa Catarina

São Paulo

Non-public tramway:

Note for São Paulo - Tramway da Cantareira: Narrow-gauge light railway. Connected São Paulo, Cantareira, and Guarulhos. Electrification of Guarulhos line planned (ca. 1942, not carried out. Cantareira line closed 1957. Guarulhos line closed 31 May 1965.

Sergipe

See also
List of trolleybus systems in Brazil
List of town tramway systems
List of town tramway systems in South America
List of light-rail transit systems
List of rapid transit systems

References

Books and periodicals shown in List of town tramway systems

Tramways
Brazil